Spring Mill is a home rule-class city in Jefferson County, Kentucky, United States. The population was 287 at the 2010 census, down from 380 at the 2000 census.

Geography
Spring Mill is located in southern Jefferson County at  (38.144064, -85.632598).

Demographics

At the 2000 census, there were 380 people, 130 households and 121 families residing in the city. The racial makeup of the city was 98.42% White, 0.53% Asian, and 1.05% from two or more races. Hispanic or Latino of any race were 1.32% of the population.

There were 130 households, of which 35.4% had children under the age of 18 living with them, 86.9% were married couples living together, 5.4% had a female householder with no husband present, and 6.9% were non-families. 6.2% of all households were made up of individuals, and 4.6% had someone living alone who was 65 years of age or older. The average household size was 2.92 and the average family size was 3.04.

25.8% of the population were under the age of 18, 5.8% from 18 to 24, 21.8% from 25 to 44, 33.9% from 45 to 64, and 12.6% who were 65 years of age or older. The median age was 43 years. For every 100 females, there were 100.0 males. For every 100 females age 18 and over, there were 89.3 males.

The median household income was $73,250 and the median family income was $72,750. Males had a median income of $50,625 and females $31,500. The per capita income was $29,849. None of the population or families were below the poverty line.

References

Cities in Jefferson County, Kentucky
Cities in Kentucky
Louisville metropolitan area
Populated places established in 1983